Lace bite is an irritation of the tibialis anterior and toe extensor tendons. The medical term for the condition is "tibialis anterior tendinopathy." This irritation, felt on the front of the foot or ankle, is often experienced by ice hockey players and figure skaters. It is caused by friction between the tendon and tongue of the ice skate.

Signs and symptoms 
Common symptoms of lace bite include:

 Pain, tenderness, and swelling where the front of the ankle meets the foot
 Discomfort with ankle motion, especially when pulling the foot up or turning it inward
 A cracking sound when the front of the foot or ankle is moved or touched

Treatment 
Prevention and treatment options for lace bite include:

 Tying the skate's laces outside-in instead of inside-out
 Adjusting the skate's tongue position
 Using a gel pad that covers the irritated section of the foot and ankle
 Icing the foot and ankle after skating

See also 

 Sports injury
 Ice hockey
 Ice skating

References 

Sports injuries
Ankle